Albert Vanloo (Brussels, 10 September 1846 – 1920, Paris) was a Belgian librettist and playwright. 

Vanloo lived in Paris as a child and was attracted to the theatre. As a young student he began writing plays and opéra comique libretti, notably with Eugène Leterrier who remained his main collaborator until the latter's death in 1884. He also worked with the writers William Busnach, Henri Chivot and Georges Duval.

Libretti

For Alexandre Charles Lecocq

 Giroflé-Girofla (1874) - with Eugène Letterier
 La petite mariée (1875) - with Letterier
 La Marjolaine (1877) - with Letterier
 La Camargo (1879) - with Letterier
 La jolie persane (1879) - with Letterier
 Le jour et la nuit (1881) - with Letterier
 Ali-Baba (1887) - with William Busnach
 La belle au bois dormant (1900) - with Georges Duval

For Jacques Offenbach

 Le voyage dans la lune (1875) - with Leterrier and A Mortier
 Mam'zelle Moucheron (1881) - with Leterrier

For Andre Gedalge

 Volapük-Revue (1886) - with William Busnach

For Emmanuel Chabrier

 L'étoile (1877) - with Leterrier
 Une éducation manquée (1879) - with Leterrier

For Edmond Audran
 L'oeuf rouge (1890) - with Busnach

For André Messager
 La Béarnaise (1885) with Leterrier
 Les p'tites Michu (1897) - with Duval
 Véronique (1898) - with Duval
 Les dragons de l'impératrice (1905) - with Duval

Bibliography
Vanloo, Albert (1913) Sur le plateau: souvenirs d'une librettiste. Paris

References

Sources
Smith, Christopher (1992), 'Vanloo, Albert' in The New Grove Dictionary of Opera, ed. Stanley Sadie (London)

External links
List of works by Vanloo at the Index to Opera and Ballet Sources Online

1846 births
1920 deaths
Opera librettists
19th-century Belgian dramatists and playwrights
19th-century Belgian male writers
20th-century Belgian dramatists and playwrights
Belgian male dramatists and playwrights
Writers from Brussels